The 2015 Colonial Athletic Association (CAA) softball tournament was held at Veterans Memorial Park on the campus of James Madison University in Harrisonburg, Virginia from May 6 through May 8, 2015.  Hofstra won the tournament, beating the top seeded James Madison Dukes and earning the CAA's automatic bid to the 2015 NCAA Division I softball tournament. The entire tournament was aired on CAA.TV with the championship being broadcast on TV on American Sports Network.

Tournament

All times listed are Eastern Daylight Time.

References

Tournament, 2015
Tournament